Juan María Altuna Muñoa (born 8 August 1963) is a Spanish lightweight rower. He won a gold medal at the 1983 World Rowing Championships in Duisburg with the lightweight men's four. He competed in the men's eight event at the 1992 Summer Olympics.

References

1963 births
Living people
Spanish male rowers
World Rowing Championships medalists for Spain
Rowers at the 1992 Summer Olympics
Olympic rowers of Spain
People from Hondarribia
Sportspeople from Gipuzkoa
Rowers from the Basque Country (autonomous community)
20th-century Spanish people